Altamirano is a village in Janos Municipality in northwestern Chihuahua, Mexico. It had a 2010 census population of 255 inhabitants and is situated 1,800 meters (5,906 ft.) above sea level.

References
2010 census tables: INEGI

Populated places in Chihuahua (state)